{{Infobox Boxingmatch
| Fight Name = Who R U Picking?
| fight date = May 1, 2010
| image = 
| location = MGM Grand Garden Arena, Paradise, Nevada, U.S.
| fighter1 = Floyd Mayweather Jr.
| nickname1 = Money
| record1 = 40–0 (25 KO)
| hometown1 = Grand Rapids, Michigan, U.S.
| height1 = 5 feet 8 in
| weight1 = 146 lb
| style1 = Orthodox
| recognition1 = [[The Ring (magazine)|The Ring]] No. 2 ranked pound-for-pound fighter5-division world champion
| fighter2 = Shane Mosley
| nickname2 = Sugar
| record2 = 46–5 (39 KO)
| hometown2 = Pomona, California, U.S.
| height2 = 5 feet 9 inches
|weight2 = 147 lb
|style2 = Orthodox
| recognition2 =WBA (Super) welterweight championThe Ring No. 3 ranked pound-for-pound fighter3-division world champion
| titles = 
| result =  Mayweather Jr. wins via 12-round unanimous decision (119-109, 119-109, 118-110)
}}

Floyd Mayweather Jr. vs. Shane Mosley, billed as Who R U Picking?'', was a boxing welterweight non-title superfight, in which Mayweather Jr. won by unanimous decision with two judges scoring it 119–109 and one judge scoring it 118–110. The bout was held on May 1, 2010, before a "sellout" crowd of 15,117 at the MGM Grand Garden Arena in Las Vegas, Nevada, United States. Boxing greats Muhammad Ali and Mike Tyson were among a long list of celebrities in attendance. The match was put together after Andre Berto pulled out of his scheduled January 30 unification bout against Mosley.

Build up
Talk about a fight between Mayweather and Mosley went back as far as 1999.

However the first serious talk of fight between the fighters came after Floyd Mayweather's win over Juan Manuel Marquez, when the two fighters confronted each other and started shoving and insulting each other. However following this incident each fighter went his own way, only to meet up again.

Shane Mosley was scheduled to face Andre Berto for a WBC and WBA Welterweight title unification bout on January 30, 2010. However, the fight (and entire undercard) was called off on January 18, 2010, due to an earthquake in Haiti and Berto losing several family members in the disaster. Negotiations for a proposed matchup between Mosley and Floyd Mayweather Jr. immediately began afterwards, ending with both sides agreeing to a set date of May 1, 2010, at the MGM Grand Garden Arena in Las Vegas, Nevada. The fight was billed "Who R U Picking?"

Pre-fight hype
The earliest pre-fight hype came after Manny Pacquiao's fight with Joshua Clottey on March 13, 2010, when HBO aired a brief interview, confrontational-styled show entitled, "Face Off" with Max Kellerman hosting and leading the conversation.

However the first major pre-fight hype took part when HBO produced a four-part prelude of their show 24/7. The series, titled Mayweather-Mosley 24/7, aired installments all throughout April 2010. The series focused on each fighter's training and preparation for the bout. For Mosley, the fight was very symbolic, and a way to show he is the best boxer in the world. For Mayweather, the fight was seen as just business, and Mosley as just another fighter.

During one installment of Mayweather-Mosley 24/7, Mayweather proclaimed himself the greatest boxer of all time, better than Sugar Ray Robinson and Muhammad Ali, and made light of Mosley's skill.

On the night of the fight one commentator called it "the most highly anticipated welterweight matchup since Sugar Ray Leonard stopped Thomas Hearns in the 14th round in 1981."

Drug testing
Both Floyd Mayweather Jr. and Shane Mosley agreed to Olympic style drug testing for this fight, which included random sampling of blood and urine. This was the first fight in the United States to undergo these conditions.

This style of drug testing was promoted from Mayweather due to his purported concern of the health of many fighters who face medical problems later in life due to drug use, as well as a way to make clear no cheating, imagined or otherwise, is taking place. Mayweather first proposed this when negotiations with Manny Pacquiao first took place in early 2010; they had both agreed to random urine testing and three blood tests, but Mayweather also demanded additional random blood testing, even though that is not required under the rules of the Nevada State Athletic Commission, and the fight ultimately fell apart. After alleging, without evidence, that Pacquiao used performance-enhancing drugs, Mayweather was required to pay Pacquiao a seven-figure settlement after Pacquiao sued him for those unsubstantiated claims.

The fight
Entering the fight, Mayweather was a 1:4 favorite.

Mosley started the match strong, winning round one. Round two belonged to Mosley once again as he hurt then buckled Mayweather's knees with powerful rights. Mayweather appeared to be in trouble for the first time in his career, but stayed on his feet. The close calls inspired the crowd to break into a chant of "Mosley! Mosley! Mosley!" When later asked how he survived the onslaught Mayweather replied, "it's a contact sport, and you're going to get hit. You got to suck it up and keep on fighting."

After the trying second round, Mayweather bounced back with quick, precise punching, and avoided further trouble. He picked up his offense and controlled round three and four with fast combinations and low body jabs. A strong right in the fourth sent Mosley reeling. As the fight progressed, Mosley began to slow down. In the middle rounds, he backed off on offense and Mayweather took advantage by picking up points with non-damaging hits. By the seventh round, Mosley look winded. In the eighth, he became frustrated and received a referee warning after it appeared he tried to toss Mayweather to the ground in a wrestling-style move. By the end of ninth, Mosley had a "look of resignation on his face" as he walked back to his corner.

Mayweather ending up losing only the second round, according to the judges' scorecards, winning the 12 round fight by unanimous decision. Two judges had the final margin at 119–109, while the third had it at 118–108. The win improved Mayweather to 41–0 in his career, while dropping Mosley to 46–6.

After the fight, Mosley said neck tightness inhibited his fight. "I tried to move around, but he was too quick and I was too tight ... I thought I had to knock him out [early]". "I couldn't adjust and he did", Mosley added. Mayweather remarked, "I came here tonight to give the fans what they wanted to see: a toe-to-toe battle. It wasn't the same style, but I wanted to be aggressive and I knew I could do it." He said he was ready to take on Manny Pacquiao, if he "wants to fight" and "will take the blood and urine tests".

Fight earnings
Starting around May 10 many reports stated that the official number of PPV buys for the fight was 1.4 million. This is mostly according from Leonard Ellerbe, the advisor for Floyd Mayweather and an inside source on the topic.

On May 11, HBO officially released that the fight generated $78.3 million in revenue.

According to initial inside sources the PPV buyrate was expected to be around 1.1 to 1.5 million. buys. With Richard Schaefer, the CEO of Golden Boy Promotions, who sponsored the fight saying he first thought that the buyrate would be around 3.5 to 4 million.

Mayweather received a guaranteed $22.5 Million for the fight, plus a bonus for PPV subscriptions which later amounted to around $40 million, while Mosley got $6.7 million.

Undercard

Televised
 Super Welterweight bout:  Canelo Álvarez def.  Jose Miguel Cotto (TKO, 9th round referee stoppage)
Álvarez defeated Cotto via technical knockout in the ninth round.
 Featherweight bout:  Daniel Ponce de León def.  Cornelius Lock (unanimous decision)
Ponce de Leon defeated Lock via unanimous decision (96–94, 97–93, 96–94). The fight was a title defense for Ponce de Leon's, WBC Latino Featherweight title.
 Welterweight bout:  Said Ouali def.  Hector Saldivia (TKO, 1st round referee stoppage)
Ouali defeated Saldivia via technical knockout in the first round. The fight was a WBA Welterweight title eliminator.

Untelevised
 Super Featherweight bout:  Eloy Perez def.  Gilberto Sanchez Leon (majority decision)
Perez defeated Leon via majority decision (95–95, 97–93, 96–94). The fight was a title defense for Perez's WBO NABO Super Featherweight title.
 Light Welterweight bout:  Jesse Vargas def.  Arturo Morua (TKO, 6th round referee stoppage)
Vargas defeated Morua via technical knockout in the sixth round.
 Lightweight bout:  Luis Ramos Jr. def.  Allen Litzau (TKO, 2nd round referee stoppage)
Ramos Jr. defeated Litzau via technical knockout in the second round.
 Middleweight bout:  Dion Savage def.  Tommie Speller (unanimous decision)
Savage defeated Speller via unanimous decision (80–72, 80–72, 80–72).
 Light Welterweight:  Daniel Reece def.  Nichoulas Briannes (unanimous decision)
Reece defeated Briannes via unanimous decision.

International broadcasting

References

Mosley
2010 in boxing
Boxing in Las Vegas
2010 in sports in Nevada
Golden Boy Promotions
May 2010 sports events in the United States
MGM Grand Garden Arena
Events in Paradise, Nevada